Chlorhoda pallens is a moth of the subfamily Arctiinae first described by Hervé de Toulgoët and David T. Goodger in 1985.

References

Arctiini